The Church Patronage (Scotland) Act 1874 (37 & 38 Vict c 82) was an Act of the Parliament of the United Kingdom of Great Britain and Ireland. It repealed the Church Patronage (Scotland) Act 1711. It was passed on 7 August 1874 and its long title is An Act to alter and amend the laws relating to the Appointment of Ministers to Parishes in Scotland.

The Church of Scotland had always opposed the 1711 Act, claiming it was contrary to the Treaty of Union between Scotland and England and an unlawful interference by the civil power in purely spiritual matters of Church government, namely the appointment of Ministers. After 163 years of struggle - including annual petitions to Parliament and a series of splits in the Church - the Original Secession of 1733, and the Great Disruption leading to the setting up of the Free Church of Scotland - along with costly defeats in the Court of Session - the abolition of Patronage was very welcome to the Church.

Paragraph 3 of the 1874 Act declared 

Other paragraphs spelled out definitions, to prevent the Act being subverted by devices or processes used by Patrons in the past, and made it clear that the Church of Scotland would decide on the qualifications required by Ministers, and the bodies and processes which would be involved in any appointment.

The Church of Scotland and a United Free Church of Scotland were reunited in 1929, following other legislation, though a small remnant of the latter preferred to remain independent.

Notes

United Kingdom Acts of Parliament 1874
Acts of the Parliament of the United Kingdom concerning Scotland
1874 in Scotland
Christianity and law in the 19th century
Law about religion in the United Kingdom
Church of Scotland